Great Somerford is a village and civil parish within Dauntsey Vale, Wiltshire, England, near the south bank of the river Avon. The hamlet of Startley and the location of Seagry Heath are within the bounds of the parish.

The parish boundaries to the northeast and east follow the Avon, or in some places the river's former course.  In the northwest the boundary partly follows the Rodbourne stream, a small tributary which joins the Avon northwest of the village. The Brinkworth Brook joins the Avon in the northwest corner of the parish.

History
Eight estates were recorded in the 1086 Domesday Book at the Somerfords, with altogether 80 households. The mound of a motte castle, 40 metres in diameter and probably from the 12th century, stands immediately east of the church. South of the mound is the Mount House, a 16th-century manor house, refronted in the 19th and now Grade II* listed.

In 1377 there were 92 poll-tax payers at Great Somerford and 10 at Startley. The population of the parish grew from 358 at the 1801 census to 481 in 1821, then remained in the range 500-556 until 1911, falling to 421 in 1921. Housebuilding in the 1960s and 1980s brought numbers above 700.

Allotment gardens
Great Somerford has Britain's first allotments. Enclosure of common land, facilitated by the Inclosure Act 1773, greatly reduced the amount of land available for personal cultivation by the poor. Stephen Demainbray, rector 1799–1854 and a Chaplain to King George III, asked the King to spare part of his parish from the enclosures of 1809. Plots were allotted to villages for one-year terms.

The Free Gardens continue in use; the Seagry Heath site reverted to private ownership. The 200th anniversary in 2009 was marked by an edition of the BBC Radio 4 programme, Gardeners' Question Time.

Railway

A station, at first named Somerford, was just east of the river crossing.

The name of the station was changed to Great Somerford in 1903 when the GWR opened a more direct route to South Wales, passing half a mile (900 metres) to the north near Little Somerford, where a new station was built. In 1922 the goods yard at Great Somerford was closed and the station was downgraded to Great Somerford Halt. In 1933, Little Somerford station was linked to the Malmesbury branch and became the junction station. The line south to Dauntsey, along with the halt, was closed in July of that year.

Religious sites

Parish church

There was a church at Great Somerford in the late 12th century. The present Church of England parish church of St Peter and St Paul is built of rubble stone and is from the 14th and 15th centuries, with restoration in 1865 by J.H. Hakewill. Decoration of the chancel roof in 1901 to designs of F.C. Eden was described by Pevsner as "extremely prettily painted with stylized flowers". The south porch was rebuilt in 1905 using old materials.

The tower carries six bells: one of c. 1480 and another of 1634. The ashlar gate piers, with stone urns, at the entrance to the churchyard are 18th century.

The church was designated as Grade I listed in 1959. Today the parish forms part of the Woodbridge Group of six churches.

Methodists 
Primitive Methodists were meeting at Startley by 1843, and in 1850–51 an average congregation of 90 attended Sunday services. A chapel was built in 1854, just south of the junction with Heath Lane, and was extended in 1860. The chapel closed in 1985 and is now a private house; the small cemetery on the opposite side of the road remains.

At Great Somerford, Methodists bought the red brick village reading room in 1882 for use as a chapel. (The reading room had been built in 1872 at the expense of Wiltshire MP Walter Powell and was sold following his death.) In 2016 the building was still in use as a Methodist church within the North Wiltshire circuit, holding fortnightly services which alternate with the church at Cleverton.

Governance
The civil parish elects a parish council. It is in the area of Wiltshire Council unitary authority, which is responsible for most significant local government functions. The current Wiltshire councillor for the Brinkworth ward (which includes Great Somerford) is Toby Sturgis, a councillor for the Conservative Party. The parish is also part of the North Wiltshire parliamentary constituency, which is, as of May 2017, represented by James Gray, also a member of the Conservative party.

Amenities
The first purpose-built school at Great Somerford was built in 1828, then enlarged in 1850, 1870 and 1895. Children of all ages attended until 1954, when those aged 11 and over went to Malmesbury secondary school. In 1982, Somerfords' Walter Powell Primary School was built on a new site to the east of the village, to replace the 19th-century school and that at Little Somerford.

Great Somerford has a shop with Post Office. There is also a pub, the Volunteer Inn, a building from the early 19th century.

Landmarks

Great Somerford Measuring Station
In 1963 the Environment Agency constructed a river level measuring station consisting of one of the earliest compound crump weirs in Britain. The typical river level range is between 15 and 70 centimetres; the highest level recorded was 2.43 metres. During the widespread flooding in 2007, the river level reached 2.06 metres on 21 July, whilst flooding in July 1968 drowned the entire structure.

World War II pillboxes 
There are three remaining Second World War pillboxes in the village. The first faces the river and the disused railway. The second is on the edge of a medium-sized field next to the Avon; there has been no damage to this pillbox, though in heavy rain it tends to flood. The third pillbox is along the left of Dauntsey Road, opposite a small cottage.

References

External links 

 Great Somerford Parish Council
 Old photographs at Francis Frith
 Village Design Statement, 2003
 A Vision of Britain Through Time – A vision of Britain between 1801 and 2001. Including maps, statistical trends and historical descriptions.
 GENUKI – UK & Ireland Genealogy
 

Villages in Wiltshire
Civil parishes in Wiltshire